Big Bag is an American children's television series created by Nina Elias-Bamberger for Cartoon Network and Children's Television Workshop (now Sesame Workshop). It was targeted at preschool viewers. The show was co-produced by Cartoon Network and CTW, with Muppet characters created by the Jim Henson Company. It aired from 1996 to 1998, with reruns airing through 2001, alongside another program titled Small World. Localized versions of Big Bag aired on Canal J in France and Yorkshire Television in the UK.

Plot
The principal Muppet character is Chelli, a puppet dog who is joined by his best friend Bag. Chelli and Bag run a general store. They live on Main Street in an unidentified town with their human friend Molly and a variety of other animals named for their species. Two sock puppets named Lyle the Sock and Argyle McSock work as stockroom boys and often interact with the main cast. In season 2, a humanoid Muppet character called Sofie was introduced. The first season features frequent interaction with a large cast of human regulars, including an assortment of child friends and colorful locals.

Cast and characters

Muppets
 Chelli (performed by Joey Mazzarino) – A patchwork dog who is the main puppet character of the series. In "Elmo's Visit," it is revealed that he is a pen pal of Elmo. He was designed by Ed Eyth and built by Rollie Krewson.
 Bag (performed by Rickey Boyd) – An anthropomorphic cloth bag who is Chelli's best friend. It talks in its own gibberish which the other characters appear to understand.
  Argyle and Lyle (performed by Rickey Boyd and Joey Mazzarino, 1996–1997; Jeff Conover, 1997-1998) – Two socks that are known for telling knock-knock jokes, which Lyle usually refers to as "sock-sock" jokes. When they are not hanging out in the store's sock bin, they can be found in a laundry hamper or the storeroom. Lyle speaks with a Brooklyn accent, whereas Argyle speaks with a Scottish accent.
 Sofie (performed by Alice Dinnean) – A girl who joins the cast in the second season.
Additional puppets were performed by Jeff Conover, Andy Stone, and Matt Vogel.

Humans
 Molly (portrayed by Selena Nelson) – A female human that Chelli and Bag live with.
 Kim (portrayed by Tessa Ludwick) – A human girl who is a friend of Chelli and Bag.
 Joey (portrayed by John Mountford and Adrian Smith) – A human boy who is a friend of Chelli and Bag.
  Bernard (portrayed by Cullen Douglas) – A crossing guard who asks viewers if they have their telescope or hat as preludes to the Troubles the Cat and Samuel and Nina segments.
 Trudy (portrayed by Clare Sera) – An exercise instructor.
 Martha (portrayed by Clare Sera) – A shy woman.
 Josie (portrayed by Clare Sera) – A female mail carrier who shows up to show "I did something nice today" videotapes to Chelli and Bag.
 Doc Furrball (portrayed by Cullen Douglas) – A veterinarian.
 Waldo Muckle (portrayed by Cullen Douglas) – An egotistic inventor and handyman. In "One Little Lie," it is revealed that Waldo does not swim but enjoys snorkeling.
 Neighborhood Kids (portrayed by Ashley Jones and Jamie Ryan) – The Neighborhood Kids are friends of Molly, Chelli, and Bag who occasionally appear alongside the other humans.

Voice cast
 María Conchita Alonso – Troubles the Cat ("Troubles the Cat" segments)
 Fran Brill – Nina ("Samuel and Nina" segments)
 Ashley Carin – Sarah ("Troubles the Cat" segments)
 James Spector – Ace ("Ace & Avery" segments)
 Kevin Clash – Avery ("Ace & Avery" segments)
 Allen Enlow – Samuel ("Samuel and Nina" segments)
 Pam Lewis – Little Chick ("Slim Pig" segments)
 Andrew Sachs – Narrator ("William's Wish Wellingtons" segments)
 James Spector – Slim Pig ("Slim Pig" segments)

Animated segments
The scenes with Shelly and friends served as frames for a variety of individual animated segments, which were also rotated between seasons. As opposed to the shorter clips on Sesame Street, the animated segments ran approximately 3 to 8 minutes each and were produced by various studios in New York City, Australia, and Europe, often with consultation from Sesame Workshop and Cartoon Network (Big Bag aired back to back with Small World, another preschool series which showcased different international cartoons). The shorts included:

 Troubles the Cat – This is the first totally original cartoon based on Latino characters to air in the United States. It was created by then 5-year-old Marina Mendez and Karen Mendez Smith and developed for television by Nina Elias-Bamberger, Jim Martin, Marie Poe, Luis Santeiro, and Nina Shelton. The show was produced by The Ink Tank in New York, with character designs by Santiago Cohen. The group of kids includes a six-year-old Latina named Marina and her multicultural friends. Marina's cat Troubles (voiced by María Conchita Alonso) uses a "troublescope" to sniff out problems that develop in the group's relationships. Troubles invites home viewers to do the same, using their cardboard tubes as troublescopes "to see what the kids are really thinking and feeling". 24 episodes were made and it was the only other short, along with Koki, to be carried into the second season.
 William's Wish Wellingtons – William's magic Wellington boots make any wish come true. They're a wonderful tool to solve problems with if he can only figure out the right thing to wish for. Each story, whether it's about looking for buried treasure or William wishing himself invisible at his sister's wedding, sparks the imagination of viewers. 13 out of 26 episodes made were aired. Andrew Sachs provides the narration.
 Slim Pig – A two-dimensional pig who lives in a three-dimensional world named Slim Pig (voiced by James Spector) is a uniquely proportioned animal who can slide between the barriers that surround his farm and assume various shapes. Slim Pig demonstrates that it can be fun to explore and discover new things. Fellow farm animals like Duck, Little Chick, Rooster, and Horse admire Slim for his ability and desire to venture beyond their world. 13 episodes were made.
 Koki – In this claymation segment, a four-year-old chick named Koki has a life similar to that of a preschool child. Koki is learning new responsibilities while adapting to relationships with her family and friends. Koki's younger sibling, an egg, represents a new challenge for her. 13 episodes were made. This animated series is Spanish in origin and was not originally produced specifically for Big Bag.
 Tobias Totz and His Lion – Centered around the relationship between two unlikely friends: a man named Tobias and a not-so-ferocious lion. Tobias is a retired zookeeper who is frequently asked to return to the zoo and solve problems. These shorts explore alternative solutions to difficult situations. 13 out of 25 episodes made were aired.
  Samuel and Nina – A dog alter-ego of Charlie Chaplin named Samuel (voiced by Allen Enlow) and a prudent, down-to-earth squirrel named Nina (voiced by Fran Brill) embark on adventures and help humans and creatures in distress by using their imagination. Samuel shapes his hat into a creative piece of apparel, appropriate for his role in each crisis, and prompts viewers to do the same. 13 episodes were made.

In the second season, every segment except Troubles the Cat and Koki was removed. A new segment was added:

  Ace and Avery –  This segment focused on a bespectacled boy Ace (voiced by James Spector) and his raccoon sidekick Avery (voiced by Kevin Clash). This segment was the most likely to incorporate craft elements from the main storyline. 13 episodes were made. This segment was made by John R. Dilworth, who would later go on to create Courage the Cowardly Dog.

Series overview
<onlyinclude>

Episodes

Season 1 (1996)

Season 2 (1998)

Home media

Five Big Bag VHS tapes were released by Warner Home Video: "Share With Us", "Explore With Us" and "Imagine With Us" in 1997, and "Dance With Us" and "Sing With Us" in 1998. However, there were no DVD releases for the show, and currently, the show is not available on HBO Max. The VHS releases of show got Spanish dubbed counterparts alongside the English ones.

See also
 Oobi, a similar co-production connected to Sesame Street
 ITV Studios, which produced the UK version
Tickle U, a similar co-production programming block connected to Cartoon Network

References

External links
 
  at Moviefone
 

1990s American children's comedy television series
1990s American sketch comedy television series
1996 American television series debuts
1998 American television series endings
1990s preschool education television series
American preschool education television series
American television series with live action and animation
American television shows featuring puppetry
Cartoon Network original programming
Children's sketch comedy
English-language television shows
Television series by Sesame Workshop
Television series about children
Television shows about dogs
Sesame Street